The International Socialist Bureau (French: Bureau Socialiste International) was the permanent organization of the Second International, established at the Paris congress of 1900. Before this there was no organizational infrastructure to the "Second International" beyond a series of periodical congresses, which weren't even given a uniform name. The host party of the next congress was charged with organizing it.

After the International Socialist Congress of Paris of 1900, a permanent Bureau was established which met periodically in between congresses. A permanent secretariat was also established in Brussels. There were in all 16 plenary meetings of the Bureau.

The membership of the bureau was fluid from meeting to meeting, each country sending one to three representatives at a time. Many illustrious figures of the socialist movement, and several future heads of state or government were members at one time or another.

All this information is taken from La Deuxième Internationale, 1889-1914: étude critique des sources, essai bibliographique by Georges Haupt

Plenary meetings

1st. Brussels; December 30, 1901

2nd. Brussels; December 29, 1902

3rd. Brussels; July 20, 1903

4th. Brussels; February 7, 1904

5th Amsterdam; August 15, 1904

6th. Brussels; January 15, 1905

7th. Brussels; March 4–5, 1906 

Consultative members: Garske of the Workers party of Latvia and Lew of the Socialist Party of Armenia

8th. Brussels; November 10, 1906 

Consultative members Stanislas Kurski; Leo Bergman of the General Jewish Labour Bund; O. Braun of the Latvian Social Democrats

9th. Brussels; June 9, 1907 

Consultative members Stanislas Kurski; Leo Bergman of the General Jewish Labour Bund; O. Braun of the Latvian Social Democrats

10th. Brussels; October 10, 1908

11th. Brussels; November 7, 1909

12th. Copenhagen; August 26–31, September 2–3, 1910

13th. Zurich; September 23–24, 1911

14th. Brussels; October 28–29, 1912

15th. London; December 13–14, 1913

16th. Brussels; July 29–30, 1914

First World War 

In autumn 1914, shortly after the occupation of most of Belgium by German troops, the executive committee decided to move the headquarters from Brussels to the Hague, with the approval of the Belgian Labor Party. The all Belgian Executive Committee also unanimously decided to expand itself by adding three Dutch members, Troelstra, Van Kol and Albarda, with Vleigen and Wibaut as alternates. Camille Huysmans, a Belgian, remained Secretary. This arrangement was approved by all of the affiliated parties, except the French party which decline to vote, believing that the International should have stayed "where it was and what it was".

In the early months of the war the Executive Committee resisted efforts to call a full meeting of the Bureau, feeling that it would have been impossible to get delegates from certain countries together and feeling that an unrepresentative meeting might mean the dissolution of the International altogether. In January and February 1915 the BSI attempted to hold a series of separate, one-on-one meetings with representatives of the parties in belligerent nations. The French refused to send a delegation to the Hague. The British were at first willing, but opted out after Arthur Henderson became a member of the War Cabinet. The Belgians were the first to send a delegation, and the German party met with the executive twice.

The BSI was pointedly hostile to the Zimmerwald Conference. At a speech to the congress of the Dutch party Huysmans ridiculed the Zimmerwaldians for their impatience, as well as for the unrepresentative and "amateur" nature of the conference. Huysmans later reportedly made special trips to Britain and France to dissuade socialists in those countries from attending the Kienthal Conference. Partly in response to Zimmerwald and Kienthal, though, the Bureau arranged for a meeting of socialists from the neutral countries. Originally scheduled for June 23, 1916 this conference finally met at the Hague on July 30-August 2, 1916. Consisting of nine delegates from Argentina, the United States (Algernon Lee), the Netherlands, Denmark and Sweden, the conference passed a resolution expressing confidence in the Executive Committee and deprecating any effort to break up the official International

In April 1917, after the March Revolution in Russia, Stauning of Denmark  wrote to the BSI stating that if they were unable to summon a general conference of Socialist parties, it would be organized without them. Upon getting this appeal the Dutch members of the Executive Committee left for Stockholm. Huysmans soon joined them setting up the secretariat of the Bureau at the Trade Union House of the Swedish Socialist Party. On May 2 Huysmans and Engberg became the Secretariats representative in a new organization, the
Dutch-Scandinavian Committee which attempted to convene a general socialist conference at Stockholm for the remainder of 1917, without success.

In November 1918 Huysmans worked in concert with the committee appoint by the fourth Inter-Allied Socialist Conference for the convening of a socialist conference of the formerly belligerent nations. The final result of this was the Berne Conference of 1919.

See also 
Neutral Socialist Conferences during the First World War
International Socialist Commission

References

External links 
Christine Collette "The Second International and its Bureau, 1900-1905"

History of socialism
Second International